Kristófer Ingi Kristinsson (born 7 April 1999) is an Icelandic professional footballer who plays as a forward for Eerste Divisie club VVV-Venlo.

Club career

Stjarnan
A product of the Stjarnan youth academy, Kristófer grew to become an Icelandic youth international while playing for their youth teams.[1] He attracted the interest of Eredivisie club SC Heerenveen, trialling with the side in 2014.[2] At the age of 16, he made his debut as a substitute for Stjarnan's first team during a 3–2 away loss to Keflavík on 9 March 2016 in the Icelandic League Cup.

Willem II
On 12 July 2016, Kristófer signed a three-year contract with Eredivisie club Willem II, making his league debut on 25 February 2018 during a 1–0 home win over Roda JC Kerkrade, replacing Bartholomew Ogbeche in injury time. He scored his first goal for the club, as well as his first goal in professional football, on 15 September 2018 in a league match against Excelsior, completing Willem II's late comeback by scoring the 2–2 equalizer.

Grenoble
Kristófer refused to extend his expiring contract with Willem II in 2019 and, despite interest from PSV Eindhoven, opted to sign with French Ligue 2 club Grenoble on 18 June 2019. He made his debut for the club on 8 November 2019, replacing Florian Raspentino in the 76th minute of a 0–0 draw against Le Mans.

One year after joining Grenoble, he would move to PSV after all, when he was sent on a one-season loan to their reserve team Jong PSV competing in the second-tier Eerste Divisie. With eight goals in 32 appearances, Kristófer became the top goalscorer for Jong PSV in the 2020–21 season.

SønderjyskE
On 25 July 2021, Kristófer signed a three-year contract with Danish Superliga club SønderjyskE. He made his debut for the club the following day, coming off the bench for Jeppe Simonsen in the 77th minute in a 1–0 home win in the league. Kristófer had limited success at the club, scoring no goals in 20 league appearances, as SønderjyskE suffered relegation to the Danish 1st Division in the 2021–22 season. On 1 September 2022, the club confirmed that they had terminated Kristófer's contract after mutual agreement.

VVV-Venlo
On 5 September 2022, Kristófer joined Eerste Divisie club VVV-Venlo on a one-year contract, with an option for an additional season. He made his debut for VVV against his former club Jong PSV on 16 September, replacing Nick Venema in the 63rd minute of a 1–1 home draw at De Koel.

Career statistics

Club

References

External links
 

1999 births
People from Garðabær
Living people
Association football midfielders
Kristófer Kristinsson
Kristófer Kristinsson
Kristófer Kristinsson
Kristófer Kristinsson
Eredivisie players
Eerste Divisie players
Ligue 2 players
Danish Superliga players
Danish 1st Division players
Kristófer Kristinsson
Willem II (football club) players
Grenoble Foot 38 players
Jong PSV players
SønderjyskE Fodbold players
VVV-Venlo players
Icelandic expatriate sportspeople in the Netherlands
Icelandic expatriate sportspeople in France
Icelandic expatriate sportspeople in Denmark
Expatriate footballers in the Netherlands
Expatriate footballers in France
Expatriate men's footballers in Denmark
Footballers at the 2014 Summer Youth Olympics